Colombia competed at the 2017 World Games held in Wrocław, Poland.

Archery 

Sara López won the gold medal in the women's compound event.

Bowling 

Clara Guerrero and Rocio Restrepo won the gold medal in the women's doubles event.

Clara Guerrero won the silver medal in the women's singles event.

References 

Nations at the 2017 World Games
2017 in Colombian sport
2017